Kazimir (or Casimir) Hnatow (9 November 1929 – 16 December 2010) was a former French footballer and manager of Ukrainian descent.

Club career
Hnatow began his career at Metz in 1951, where he would spend two seasons, making fifty six appearances and scoring ten goals. In 1953, he joined Stade Français. He spent three seasons at the Parisian club, making twenty nine appearances and scoring nine goals. He then joined Angers in 1956, and in the following year, he was a runner-up in the Coupe de France final, losing 6–3 to Toulouse. He made two hundred and forty three appearances and scored nineteen goals for the Pays de la Loire-based team. He then ended his career in a player-coach role at Chamois Niortais.

International career
Hnatow was part of the French squad which finished third at the 1958 FIFA World Cup, but he never won a cap for the France national football team.

Managerial career
Hnatow managed amateur side Chamois Niortais in two separate spells; the first as a player-coach from 1963 to 1966, and the second alongside Robert Charrier during the 1972-73 Championnat de France amateur Division 3 season. He is one of three coaches to manage the club on two occasions, the other two being Charrier and Pascal Gastien.

References

External links
 Profile - Niort
 Profile - FC Metz

1929 births
2010 deaths
French footballers
1958 FIFA World Cup players
FC Metz players
Stade Français (association football) players
Angers SCO players
Chamois Niortais F.C. players
Ligue 1 players
Ligue 2 players
French people of Ukrainian descent
French football managers
Chamois Niortais F.C. managers
Association football midfielders